A rubber tyred gantry crane / RTG (crane), or sometimes transtainer, is a wheeled mobile gantry crane operated to ground or stack intermodal containers. Inbound containers are stored for future pickup by drayage trucks, and outbound are stored for future loading onto vessels. RTGs typically straddle multiple lanes, with one lane reserved for container transfers. 
Advantages:its mobility gives a rubber tyred gantry crane wide appliance

Due to the lack of an electrical grid to dump energy when containers are being lowered they often have large resistor packs to rapidly dissipate the energy of a lowering or decelerating container.

There are also electric rubber tired gantry cranes. The first electrified rubber-tyred gantry cranes (ERTG) in China was unveiled by the She Kou container terminal (SCT) in Shenzhen in Aug 2008. Rubber-tired gantry cranes are also being electrified at the Port of Long Beach to improve air quality, with funding from the California Energy Commission.

Aside from the intermodal industry, RTGs also are extensively used in industry. Applications include erecting large unbalanced structures, assembling large manufacturing components, and positioning pipelines.

References

Cranes (machines)
Intermodal containers
Port infrastructure